Jim Stephenson  is a former footballer who played as a goalkeeper. He represented New Zealand at international level.

Stephenson made his full All Whites debut in a 0–2 loss to New Caledonia on 10 September 1951 and ended his international playing career with 10 A-international caps to his credit, his final cap an appearance in a 2–2 draw with Tahiti on 21 September 1952.

Stephenson appeared in six Chatham Cup finals for Northern between 1949 and 1962, gaining winners medals on his fourth and fifth attempts in 1959 and 1961.

References 

Year of birth missing (living people)
Living people
New Zealand association footballers
New Zealand international footballers
Association football goalkeepers